Renzo Alberto Yáñez Adasme (born 5 June 1980) is a Chilean football manager and former footballer who played as a forward.

Club career

Early years
Yáñez joined Deportes Santa Cruz youth ranks in January 1998, aged 18. After six months playing in Santa Cruz, he was scouted by an agent of Chilean Primera División powerhouse Universidad de Chile. In his first season with the club, Yáñez was part of the team champion of the league, being this his first professional honour. The next season, he earned again the league title and now the 2000 Copa Chile. In 2002, Yáñez was loaned to Universidad de Concepción, due to his lack of opportunities and action.

During his spell here, Renzo helped to win the Primera B title, being a key player in the season, scoring 18 goals in 32 games. After a season in Universidad de Chile with few action, he returned to Universidad de Concepción in January 2003. During his second spell at U. de Conce, Yáñez scored 5 goals in 26 matches.

Cobresal
In 2005, Yáñez joined to Cobresal.

Huachipato
In January 2006, Huachipato signed him for the 2006 Apertura Tournament.

Debut in Huachipato: vs. Antofagasta 2–0 home win (28/01/2006)
First goal in Huachipato: vs. Colo-Colo 2–0 away win. (05/12/2006)
Second goal in Huachipato: vs. Universidad de Chile 2–0 home win (01/04/2006)

http://www.emol.com/noticias/deportes/2007/05/12/255674/con-tripleta-de-renzo-yanez-huachipato-quedo-mas-cerca-de-la-sudamericana.html 12 May 2007

http://www.emol.com/noticias/deportes/2007/10/28/280071/con-goles-de-renzo-yanez-huachipato-derrota-a-la-u-de-concepcion.html 27 October 2007

Audax Italiano
On 21 December 2007, Yáñez abandoned Huachipato for join to Audax Italiano signing a two-year contract, for the 2008 Apertura Tournament and in the 2008 Copa Libertadores. He made his debut against Deportes La Serena on 2 January 2008, playing 24 minutes of game, in a 0–0 draw after of replace to Renato Ramos in the 66th minute. On 22 February, Renzo scored a hat-trick in a 4–1 victory over his former team Cobresal, of this form winning the titularity very quickly. Yáñez again scored on 15 March, in a 3–1 win over Universidad Católica, scoring the second in the 19th minute. Weeks later, on 30 March, he incremented his tally goal against Palestino in a match that Audax won 2–1. In his first tournament with the club, Yáñez scored 7 goals in 16 games during the 2008 Apertura Tournament.

Yáñez started the 2008 Clausura Tournament with a goal in a 1–1 draw against Deportes La Serena. After weeks without score, on 23 August, he scored his side's goal in a 2–1 defeat with Provincial Osorno in the 75th minute, in the 11 matchday. The next matchday of the Clausura against Universidad Católica, Renzo netted a twice in a 4–2 away win at San Carlos de Apoquindo Stadium in the 61st minute and in the 90th minute. On 27 September, he continued scoring goals, now against O'Higgins, being the only of game in a 1–0 home victory. On 25 October, he scored his thirteenth official goal for Audax in a 5–3 win over Santiago Morning.

Managerial career
From 2014 he has sporadically worked as assistant coach of Deportes Santa Cruz, reaching to manage the First Team in 2021 as a caretaker. In addition, he is the manager of the Youth Team from 2019.

Honours

Club
Universidad de Chile
 Primera División (2): 1999, 2000
 Copa Chile (1): 2000

Universidad de Concepción
 Copa Libertadores' Chilean liguilla (1): 2003

References

External links
 
 
 Renzo Yáñez at Football-Lineups
 Renzo Yáñez at playmakerstats.com (English version of ceroacero.es)

1980 births
Living people
People from Santa Cruz, Chile
Chilean footballers
Universidad de Chile footballers
Universidad de Concepción footballers
Cobresal footballers
C.D. Huachipato footballers
Audax Italiano footballers
Santiago Morning footballers
Deportes Concepción (Chile) footballers
San Marcos de Arica footballers
Curicó Unido footballers
Chilean Primera División players
Primera B de Chile players
Association football forwards
Chilean football managers
Primera B de Chile managers